Ralph Douglas Vladimir Slocombe OBE, BSC, ASC, GBCT (10 February 1913 – 22 February 2016) was a British cinematographer, particularly known for his work at Ealing Studios in the 1940s and 1950s, as well as the first three Indiana Jones films. He won BAFTA Awards in 1964, 1975, and 1979, and was nominated for an Academy Award on three occasions.

Early life
Slocombe was born in Putney, London, the son of Marie (née Karlinsky) and journalist George Slocombe (1894–1963). His mother was Russian. His father was the Paris correspondent for the Daily Herald, and so Slocombe spent part of his upbringing in France, returning to the United Kingdom  around 1933. He graduated with a degree in Mathematics from the Sorbonne. 

Slocombe initially intended to become a photojournalist, and as a young photographer, he witnessed the early events leading up to the outbreak of World War II. Visiting Danzig in 1939, he photographed the growing anti-Jewish sentiment. In consequence, he was commissioned by American film-maker Herbert Kline to film events for a documentary called Lights Out, covering a Goebbels rally and the burning of a synagogue, for which he was briefly arrested. Slocombe was in Warsaw with a movie camera on 1 September 1939 when Germany invaded. Accompanied by Kline, he escaped, but his train was machine-gunned by a German aeroplane. In 2014, he said of the experience that:
I had no understanding of the concept of blitzkrieg. I had been expecting trouble but I thought it would be in trenches, like WW1. The Germans were coming over the border at a great pace ... We were trundling through the countryside at night. We kept stopping for no apparent reason, but we came to a screeching halt because a German plane was bombing us. After its first pass we climbed out the window and crawled under the carriage. The plane came back and started machine-gunning. A young girl died in front of us.

After escaping from the train, Slocombe and Kline bought a horse and cart from a Polish farm, finally returning to London via Latvia and Stockholm.

Work

After returning to England, Slocombe became a cinematographer for the Ministry of Information, shooting footage of Atlantic convoys with the Fleet Air Arm. He also developed a relationship with Ealing Studios, where filmmaker Alberto Cavalcanti, who helped him obtain his position, worked. Some of his photography was used as second unit material for fiction films.

Slocombe moved into photographing for feature films at Ealing Studios during the later 1940s, after being hired on the strength of his documentary work. Slocombe later described his early work on Champagne Charlie (1944) as amateurish, in one case resulting in a sequence having to be reshot. However, in his career, Slocombe worked on 84 feature films over a period of 47 years.

Slocombe would later speak approvingly of Ealing's culture of script development. However, he also noted that its restrictive studio system headed by Michael Balcon, in which outside work was not normally permitted, made it impractical for him to attempt to begin a career as a director, something which he had considered.

His early films as a cinematographer included such classic Ealing comedies, notably Kind Hearts and Coronets (1949), The Man in the White Suit (1951), The Lavender Hill Mob (1951), and The Titfield Thunderbolt (1953). He was particularly praised for his flexible, high-contrast cinematography for the horror film Dead of Night (1945), and for his bright, colourful West Country summer landscapes on The Titfield Thunderbolt. 

Apart from filming, Slocombe worked also on developing plans for shots, visiting prisoner-of-war camps in Germany as part of pre-production for The Captive Heart (1946). For Saraband for Dead Lovers (1948), shot in Technicolor, the production team settled on a muted, gloomy style unusual for the time, which Slocombe in 2015 considered as among his best work of the period. The style of the film, about a doomed extramarital affair in 17th-century Germany, was variously praised as unconventional and criticised for being excessively symbolic, while also leaving exterior and interior shots poorly matched.

A special effect shot he created was a scene in Kind Hearts and Coronets, in which Alec Guinness, playing eight different characters, appeared as six of them simultaneously in the same frame. By masking the lens and locking the camera down in one place, the film was re-exposed several times with Guinness in different places on the set over several days. Slocombe recalled sleeping in the studio to make sure nobody touched the camera. Slocombe personally regarded Basil Dearden as the "most competent" of the directors he worked with at Ealing. 

He found widescreen equipment sometimes restrictive, finding the Technirama camera system used on Davy (1958) "a block of flats" and difficult to compose shots with.

After Ealing
Financial problems forced Ealing Studios to wind down from 1955 onwards, and close later in the decade. In 2015, Slocombe said of the period that "we had to get on with our careers – there was little time for sentiment."

For The Italian Job (1969), Slocombe was hired by producer Michael Deeley because "he tended to do very moody work, and he was very efficient". Slocombe later remembered shooting inside Kilmainham Gaol, a genuine closed prison, and finding the experience unpleasant: "the real thing, there is something quite terrifying about it. One knows hundreds and hundreds of people have suffered here...although this was a comedy, all this was still in the back of one's mind".

He won the British Society of Cinematographers Award five times, and was awarded its Lifetime Achievement Award in 1996. He also won a special BAFTA award in 1993. Roger Ebert particularly praised his work on Jesus Christ Superstar (1973), writing that it "achieve[s] a color range that glows with life and somehow doesn’t make the desert look barren." Not all reviews of his later colour work were favourable: while his cinematography on Never Say Never Again (1983) has been described by one author as "subtle, subdued...[it] creates a mellow mood", it has also been assessed as "muddled and brown". Notable among his later films is Rollerball (1975).

Indiana Jones films
In the 1980s, he worked with Steven Spielberg on the first three Indiana Jones films, after Spielberg enjoyed working with him as an auxiliary cinematographer on Close Encounters of the Third Kind (1977). These were among his last major projects, as he was 75 at the time of filming the last, Indiana Jones and the Last Crusade, and also began to suffer from eyesight problems in the 1980s. He was quoted in 1989 as saying of it "there's an excitement in doing action films. I probably enjoy them on a sort of Boy Scout level." Janusz Kamiński, cinematographer on Indiana Jones and the Kingdom of the Crystal Skull, said that he deliberately shot the film to emulate Slocombe's visuals, in order to create an appearance of continuity with the previous pictures.

Personal life
Slocombe experienced problems with his vision from the 1980s onwards, including a detached retina in one eye and complications from unsuccessful laser eye surgery in the other, and was nearly blind at the end of his life. In his later years, he lived in West London with his daughter, his only child. 

He was appointed Officer of the Order of the British Empire (OBE) in the 2008 New Year Honours, and attended a BAFTA dinner in his honour in 2009. He turned 100 in February 2013. Despite his blindness, Slocombe remained able to give interviews into his last years, and was interviewed by David A. Ellis in a book entitled Conversations with Cinematographers, in 2011 by French television in French, by the BBC on the invasion of Poland in 2014, and on the history of British films in 2015. He was quoted in the latter interview as saying "it's a weird feeling to have outlived virtually everyone you ever worked with."

Death
Slocombe died at the age of 103, on the morning of 22 February 2016, in a London hospital from complications following a fall.

Awards

Academy Awards
Nominee: Best Cinematography – Raiders of the Lost Ark (1981)
Nominee: Best Cinematography – Julia (1977)
Nominee: Best Cinematography – Travels with My Aunt (1972)

BAFTA
Nominee: Best Cinematography – Indiana Jones and the Temple of Doom (1985)
Nominee: Best Cinematography – Raiders of the Lost Ark (1982)
Winner: Best Cinematography – Julia (1979)
Nominee: Best Cinematography – Rollerball (1976)
Winner: Best Cinematography – The Great Gatsby (1975)
Nominee: Best Cinematography – Jesus Christ Superstar (1974)
Nominee: Best Cinematography – Travels with My Aunt (1974)
Nominee: Best Cinematography – The Lion in Winter (1969)
Nominee: Best Cinematography (Color) – The Blue Max (1967)
Nominee: Best Cinematography (B&W) – Guns at Batasi (1965)
Winner: Best Cinematography (B&W) – The Servant (1964)

Saturn Awards
Winner: Best Cinematography – Rollerball (1975)

American Society of Cinematographers
Recipient: International Award (2002)

British Society of Cinematographers
Recipient: Lifetime Achievement Award (1995)
Nominee: Best Cinematography – Indiana Jones and the Temple of Doom (1984)
Winner: Best Cinematography – Julia (1977)
Winner: Best Cinematography – The Great Gatsby (1974)
Winner: Best Cinematography – Jesus Christ Superstar (1973)
Winner: Best Cinematography – The Lion in Winter (1968)
Winner: Best Cinematography – The Servant (1963)

Los Angeles Film Critics Association
Winner: Best Cinematography – Julia (1977)

Selected filmography

 The Big Blockade (1942)
 Dead of Night (1945)
 Painted Boats (1945)
 The Captive Heart (1946)
 Hue and Cry (1947)
 The Loves of Joanna Godden (1947)
 It Always Rains on Sunday (1947)
 Saraband for Dead Lovers (1948)
 Kind Hearts and Coronets (1949)
 A Run for Your Money (1949)
 Cage of Gold (1950)
 The Man in the White Suit (1951)
 The Lavender Hill Mob (1951)
 Mandy (1952)
 The Titfield Thunderbolt (1953)
 Touch and Go (1955)
 Ludwig II (1955)
 The Smallest Show on Earth (1957)
 The Man in the Sky (1957)
 Circus of Horrors (1960)
 The Boy Who Stole a Million (1960)
 Taste of Fear (1961)
 The Young Ones (1961)
 Freud the Secret Passion (1962)
 The L-Shaped Room (1962)
 The Servant (1963)
 The Third Secret (1964)
 Guns at Batasi (1964)
 Promise Her Anything (1965)
 A High Wind in Jamaica (1965)
 The Blue Max (1966)
 Fathom (1967)
 Robbery (1967)
 The Fearless Vampire Killers (1967)
 The Lion in Winter (1968)
 The Italian Job (1969)
 The Buttercup Chain (1970)
 The Music Lovers (1970)
 Murphy's War (1971)
 Travels with My Aunt (1972)
 Jesus Christ Superstar (1973)

 The Great Gatsby (1974)
 The Maids (1974)
 The Marseille Contract (1974)
 Love Among the Ruins (1975)
 Rollerball (1975)
 That Lucky Touch (1975)
 Hedda (1975)
 The Sailor Who Fell from Grace with the Sea (1976)
 Nasty Habits (1977)
 Julia (1977)
 Caravans (1978)
 The Lady Vanishes (1979)
 Lost and Found (1979)
 Nijinsky (1980)
 Raiders of the Lost Ark (1981)
 Never Say Never Again (1983)
 The Pirates of Penzance (1983)
 Indiana Jones and the Temple of Doom (1984)
 Lady Jane (1986)
 Indiana Jones and the Last Crusade (1989)

See also
 List of centenarians (actors, filmmakers and entertainers)

References

External links
 Douglas Slocombe at the Internet Encyclopedia of Cinematographers
 
 A BAFTA Tribute to Douglas Slocombe
 The British Society of Cinematographers: Douglas Slocombe – Behind the Camera – 12-minute BBC documentary from 1999
 Douglas Slocombe, 1913-2016 at Sight & Sound

1913 births
2016 deaths
Best Cinematography BAFTA Award winners
British centenarians
British cinematographers
Film people from London
Men centenarians
Officers of the Order of the British Empire
People from Putney
British people of Russian descent